{{DISPLAYTITLE:H2O Retailing}}

 is a stock holding company which is a member company of Hankyu Hanshin Toho Group. This article covers about  a subsidiary which owns 2 department store chains: Hankyu Department Store and Hanshin Department Store.

History
March 7, 1947: The department store business was separated from Keihanshin Kyuko Railway Company (present: Hankyu Hanshin Holdings, Inc.) and Hankyu Department Stores, Inc. was founded.
October 1, 2007: "Hankyu Department Stores, Inc." subsidiarized "the Hanshin Department Store, Ltd." and was renamed "H2O Retailing Corporation". The department store business was separated to the newly founded company, "Hankyu Department Stores, Inc."
October 1, 2008: Hankyu Department Stores, Inc. consolidated the Hanshin Department Store, Ltd. and was renamed "Hankyu Hanshin Department Stores, Inc."

See also
Hankyu Hanshin Toho Group
H2O Retailing Corporation
Hankyu Hanshin Department Stores, Inc.
Hankyu Department Store
Hanshin Department Store
Hankyu Railway
Hanshin Electric Railway

References

External links
H2O Retailing Corporation
Hankyu Hanshin Department Stores, Inc.

Department stores of Japan
Companies listed on the Osaka Exchange
Companies based in Osaka Prefecture
Japanese brands
Retail companies established in 1947
Japanese companies established in 1947
Companies listed on the Tokyo Stock Exchange
Midori-kai
Hankyu Hanshin Holdings